is a Tokyo-based Japanese pharmaceutical company that develops and markets prescription and over-the-counter drug (OTC) products, especially throat and swallowing products.

History
In early 1700s, “Ryukakusan” was a family powdered herbal cough medicine handed down through generations of
the Satake clan of the Akita Domain. Shoteiji Fujii began selling it as medicine for the public in 1871.

In 1995, the company had a ¥4 billion debt. They recovered from this by selling Iatron Laboratory to Mitsubishi in 2002.

Ryukakusan's products are popular in China and Taiwan. Tourists buy their products in bulk to bring home when they travel to Japan.

Products
Ryukakusan
Ryukakusan Direct
Ryukakusan Throat Refreshers
Swallowing Aid Jelly

References

External links
 

Dewa Province
Pharmaceutical companies of Japan
Manufacturing companies based in Tokyo
Pharmaceutical companies established in 1871
Akita Prefecture
Satake clan
Japanese companies established in 1871
Japanese brands
Pharmaceutical companies based in Tokyo